Ell Pond may refer to:

Ell Pond (Massachusetts)
Ell Pond (Rhode Island)